KURM may refer to:

 KURM (AM), a radio station (790 AM) licensed to Rogers, Arkansas, United States
 KURM-FM, a radio station (100.3 FM) licensed to Gravette, Arkansas, United States